Shawen Acres, also known as the Montgomery County Children's Home, is a historic complex in Dayton, Ohio. It was added to the National Register of Historic Places on October 9, 1991.

It  was originally designed as an orphans home. Dr. Charles Shawen donated  to the county March 21, 1926 for "wayward and homeless children." The complex comprises a main building, annex, gym, and 10 English-style cottages in a park-like setting.

See also
 National Register of Historic Places listings in Dayton, Ohio

References

National Register of Historic Places in Montgomery County, Ohio
Residential buildings on the National Register of Historic Places in Ohio
Buildings and structures in Dayton, Ohio